Fairytales and Reality is the third album from Swedish/German power metal band Dionysus released August 23, 2006 (advanced Japanese release).

When asked for comment on the album, drummer Ronny Milianowicz replied: "This album is so good that you would throw away all other CDs you got only to have this one. It will make you drink beer like crazy. It will make your neighbors your worst enemies. It will make you a true metal warrior."

Track listing
 "Illusion of Life" – 5:01
 "The Orb" – 5:00
 "Blinded" – 4:42
 "The World" – 3:20
 "Spirit" – 5:33
 "Queen of Madness" – 3:43
 "The Game" – 6:05
 "True at Heart" – 4:47
 "Tides Will Turn" – 5:22
 "Dreamchaser" – 4:46
 "The End" – 7:59
 "Time Will Tell" (Demo) – 5:16
 "Bringer of Salvation" (Demo) – 4:22

Personnel
Olaf Hayer – vocals
Johnny Öhlin – guitar
Nobby Noberg – bass
Ronny Milianowicz – drums
Kaspar Daklqvist – keyboard

Credits
 Cover Art by: Derek Gores

2006 albums
AFM Records albums
Dionysus (band) albums
Albums produced by Jens Bogren